El Oso is a municipality (pop. 229) in the Spanish province of Ávila, in the autonomous community of Castile-Leon.

Megalith
The village takes its name (which means "the bear") from a megalithic monument outside the church. The monument in question may not have been intended to represent a bear.  It is classed as a Verraco, a type of prehistoric monument found in central Spain, which shares its name with the Spanish word for a boar. Local legend identifies this example as a bear.

References

External links 
  — Web Official www.ElOso.es

Municipalities in the Province of Ávila
Megalithic monuments in Spain